The 1976 North Indian Ocean cyclone season was part of the annual cycle of tropical cyclone formation. The season has no official bounds but cyclones tend to form between April and December. These dates conventionally delimit the period of each year when most tropical cyclones form in the northern Indian Ocean. There are two main seas in the North Indian Ocean—the Bay of Bengal to the east of the Indian subcontinent and the Arabian Sea to the west of India. The official Regional Specialized Meteorological Centre in this basin is the India Meteorological Department (IMD), while the Joint Typhoon Warning Center (JTWC) releases unofficial advisories. An average of five tropical cyclones form in the North Indian Ocean every season with peaks in May and November. Cyclones occurring between the meridians 45°E and 100°E are included in the season by the IMD.

Systems

Tropical Storm One (01B)

Cyclone Two (02A)

This cyclone was formed on 31 May and gradually intensified to a severe cyclone. On 3 June, the storm made landfall over Gujarat and rapidly weakened thereafter. Offshore the ship Haakon Magnus reported gust winds as high as 165 kmph. 70 people and 4500 cattle were killed due to the storm with 25,000 houses damaged. Damages in Indian Rupees were estimated to be 3 crores.

Tropical Storm Six (06B)

Tropical Storm Seven (07B)

This system formed on 6 September and rapidly intensified into a very severe cyclonic storm the next day. The storm then made landfall at Contai in West Bengal on September 11. Its remnants tracked until Madhya Pradesh and dissipated on 16 September. The storm killed 40 people and 4,000 cattle. Up to 1.25 lakh hectares crops were damaged in India. In Contai, wind speed attained speeds  as high as 155 kph at the time of landfall.

Tropical Storm Eight (08A)

Tropical Storm Nine (09B)

Cyclone Ten (10B)

This cyclone was formed on 1 November and gradually peaked to a severe cyclonic storm or Category-1 equivalent cyclone. This cyclone made landfall on 4 November close to the city of Machilipatnam. It weakened slowly and its remnants reached into the Arabian Sea on 6 November, where it couldn't able to regenerate due to unfavourable conditions and dissipated by the same night. 25 people were killed due to the storm and 13 fishermen remain missing.

Cyclone Twelve (12B)

This cyclone was formed on 15 November. Despite remaining just offshore Andhra Pradesh, the storm rapidly intensified into a severe cyclone and reached hurricane intensity. By the next day, the storm made landfall between Nellore and Kavali in its peak intensity and dissipated over Rayalaseema on 17 November. 30 people were reported to be killed due to the storm along with 10,000 houses damaged. Damages in Indian Rupees were estimated to be 3.9 crores. Nellore District was the worst affected due to the storm.

Tropical Storm Thirteen (13B)

Cyclone Fourteen (14B)

See also

North Indian Ocean tropical cyclone
1976 Atlantic hurricane season
1976 Pacific hurricane season
1976 Pacific typhoon season
Australian cyclone seasons: 1975–76, 1976–77
South Pacific cyclone seasons: 1975–76, 1976–77
South-West Indian Ocean cyclone seasons: 1975–76, 1976–77

References

External links
India Meteorological Department
Joint Typhoon Warning Center